Virginia "Ginny" Braun is a New Zealand psychology academic specialising in thematic analysis and gender studies. She is particularly known for her scholarship on the social construction of the vagina and designer vagina cosmetic surgery, body hair and heterosexuality. She is perhaps best known for her collaboration with British psychologist Victoria Clarke around thematic analysis and qualitative research methods. Together they have published numerous papers, chapters, commentaries and editorials on thematic analysis and qualitative research, and an award-winning and best selling qualitative textbook entitled Successful qualitative research. They have a thematic analysis website at The University of Auckland. More recently - with the Story Completion Research Group - they have published around the story completion method.

Academic career

After undergraduate and masters studies in psychology at the University of Auckland, Braun received a Commonwealth Scholarship to Loughborough University with Celia Kitzinger and Sue Wilkinson as her advisors for her 2000 thesis - The vagina: An analysis].

Braun returned to as a lecturer in psychology Auckland in 2001, rising to full Professor in 2017.

Her 2006 paper "Using thematic analysis in psychology" with Victoria Clarke in Qualitative Research in Psychology has more than 59,000  citations according to Google Scholar. It is also - according to Google Scholar - the most cited academic paper published in 2006.

Braun was editor of Feminism & Psychology between 2008 and 2013. She received a Distinguished Leadership Award from the American Psychological Association's Committee on Women in Psychology in 2013.

In 2015/2016 Braun went public with her experiences seeking a tubal ligation.

In 2021, Braun was awarded the Marsden Medal by the New Zealand Association of Scientists, in recognition of "her global impact on the development of qualitative empirical methods and for the generosity of spirit she expresses through this work."

Areas of expertise 

 Sex and sexuality
 Sexual health
 Gendered bodies
 Genital cosmetic surgery
 Body hair
 Food
 Feminist psychology
 Critical psychology
 Qualitative research
 Thematic analysis

Books 

 Virginia Braun and Victoria Clarke, Thematic Analysis: A Practical Guide. 2021.
 Virginia Braun, Victoria Clarke and Debra Gray, Collecting qualitative data. A practical guide to textual, media and virtual techniques. Cambridge University Press. 2017. 
 Virginia Braun and Victoria Clarke, Successful qualitative research: A practical guide for beginners. Sage. 2013.

Selected journal articles and book chapters 

 Using thematic analysis in psychology
 Reflecting on reflexive thematic analysis
 Using thematic analysis in counselling and psychotherapy research: A critical reflection
 (Mis)conceptualising themes, thematic analysis, and other problems with Fugard and Potts’ (2015) sample-size tool for thematic analysis
 Thematic analysis
 Feminist qualitative methods and methodologies in psychology: A review and reflection
 Innovations in qualitative methods
 Reflecting on qualitative research, feminist methodologies and feminist psychology: In conversation with Virginia Braun and Victoria Clarke

References

External links
 Google Scholar
 ResearchGate
 institutional homepage
 Twitter
Thematic analysis
Story completion

Living people
New Zealand women academics
New Zealand psychologists
New Zealand women psychologists
New Zealand writers
New Zealand women writers
University of Auckland alumni
Academic staff of the University of Auckland
Gender studies academics
Alumni of Loughborough University
Year of birth missing (living people)